= Hantz Group 200 =

Hantz Group 200 may refer to several ARCA Menards Series races:

- Hantz Group 200 (Michigan), a race at Michigan Speedway, first held in 1980, and held with this name in 2006 & 2007
- Hantz Group 200 (Toledo), a race at Toledo Speedway, first held in 1953 and held with the name from 2005 to 2008
- Hantz Group 200 (Berlin), a race at Berlin Raceway, first held in 1986
